"Things Change" is a song written and recorded by American country music artist Dwight Yoakam.  It was released in May 1998 as the first single from his album A Long Way Home.  The song reached number 17 on the Billboard Hot Country Singles & Tracks chart in July 1998.

Critical reception
Deborah Evans Price of Billboard gave the song a favorable review, saying that it is "a well-written treatise on the mercurial nature of relationships - nicely set against a backdrop of tasty guitar riffs."

Music video
The music video was directed by Yoakam and premiered in May 1998.

Chart performance

References

1998 singles
1998 songs
Dwight Yoakam songs
Songs written by Dwight Yoakam
Reprise Records singles
Song recordings produced by Pete Anderson